Mood Muzik 2: Can It Get Any Worse? is the 2nd mixtape in the Mood Muzik series by Joe Budden.

Critical reception

Although released as a mixtape, it is critically acclaimed and has been reviewed favorably by the New York Times. In a retrospective review, Complex Magazine named it the 12th best mixtape of all time and wrote "It turned out that deep in the dungeons of rap—where his addictions, ambitions, and failures were laid bare—Budden's potential could be fully realized." In a positive review RapReviews wrote "Why would Def Jam sign such a talented, introspective, verbose and charismatic rapper and then sit on his work without releasing it, even though he bodies track after track? Thankfully Budden decided not to wait any more and DJ On Point was willing to help him make it happen."

Track listing

References

Joe Budden albums
Albums produced by Scott Storch
Albums produced by Ron Browz
Sequel albums
2006 mixtape albums